Eben Matlis (August 28, 1923 - March 27, 2015) was a mathematician known for his contributions to the theory of rings and modules, especially for his work with injective modules over commutative Noetherian rings, and his introduction of Matlis duality.

Matlis earned his Ph.D. at the University of Chicago in 1958, with Irving Kaplansky as advisor. He is an emeritus professor at Northwestern University and was a member of the Institute for Advanced Study from August 1962 to June 1963.

Selected works

References

External links
 

1923 births
2015 deaths
20th-century American mathematicians
Algebraists
University of Chicago alumni
Northwestern University faculty
Institute for Advanced Study people